This article lists the professional tennis players who reached the highest ranking among their compatriots during the Open Era. The rankings used are ATP rankings for men (since 23 August 1973 for singles, and 1 March 1976 for doubles) and WTA rankings for women (since 3 November 1975 for singles, and 4 September 1984 for doubles).

On 11 September 2017, Garbiñe Muguruza and Rafael Nadal made Spain the first country since the United States 14 years ago to simultaneously top both the ATP and the WTA rankings, with Muguruza making her debut in the No. 1 spot. The most recent previous such pair were Serena Williams and Andre Agassi, 28 April to 11 May, 2003.

Top ranked by country – singles

Men

Women

* Monica Seles is included twice due to change of citizenship.

Most successful by country in an Open Era Grand Slam – singles

Men

Oceania
Australia: Champion (x5)
Rod Laver
1968 Wimbledon, 1969 Australian Open, 1969 French Open, 1969 Wimbledon, 1969 US Open
John Newcombe
1970 Wimbledon, 1971 Wimbledon, 1973 Australian Open, 1973 US Open, 1975 Australian Open
New Zealand: Finalist
Onny Parun
1973 Australian Open
Chris Lewis
1983 Wimbledon

North America
Bahamas: Third Round
Roger Smith 
1994 US Open
Barbados: First Round
Darian King
2017 US Open
Canada: Finalist
Milos Raonic
2016 Wimbledon
Costa Rica
Dominican Republic: Third Round
Victor Estrella Burgos
2014 US Open
El Salvador
Guatemala
Haiti: Fourth Round
Ronald Agénor
1988 US Open
Jamaica: Third Round (x2)
Dustin Brown
2013 Wimbledon, 2015 Wimbledon
Mexico: Semifinalist (x3)
Raúl Ramírez
1976 French Open, 1976 Wimbledon, 1977 French Open
United States: Champion (x14)
Pete Sampras
1990 US Open, 1993 Wimbledon, 1993 US Open, 1994 Australian Open, 1994 Wimbledon, 1995 Wimbledon, 1995 US Open, 1996 US Open, 1997 Australian Open, 1997 Wimbledon, 1998 Wimbledon, 1999 Wimbledon, 2000 Wimbledon, 2002 US Open

South America
Argentina: Champion (x4)
Guillermo Vilas
1977 French Open, 1977 US Open, 1978 Australian Open, 1979 Australian Open
Bolivia: Third Round
Mario Martinez
1983 French Open
Brazil: Champion (x3)
Gustavo Kuerten
1997 French Open, 2000 French Open, 2001 French Open
Chile: Finalist
Marcelo Ríos
1998 Australian Open
Fernando González
2007 Australian Open
Colombia: Third Round (x3)
Santiago Giraldo
2012 French Open, 2014 Wimbledon, 2015 Wimbledon
Ecuador: Champion
Andrés Gómez
1990 French Open
Paraguay: Finalist
Víctor Pecci
1979 French Open
Peru: Quarterfinalist (x2)
Jaime Yzaga
1991 Australian Open, 1994 US Open
Uruguay: Quarterfinalist
Marcelo Filippini
1999 French Open
Venezuela: Third Round
Nicolás Pereira
1995 US Open

Africa
Algeria: First Round
Lamine Ouahab
2009 Australian Open
Egypt: Quarterfinalist
Ismail El Shafei
1974 Wimbledon
Kenya:  Second Round
Paul Wekesa
1989 Australian Open
Morocco: Quarterfinalist (x4)
Younes El Aynaoui
2000 Australian Open, 2002 US Open, 2003 Australian Open, 2003 US Open
Nigeria: Fourth Round
Nduka Odizor
1983 Wimbledon
Senegal: First Round (x4)
Yahiya Doumbia
1988 French Open, 1988 Wimbledon, 1988 US Open, 1989 US Open
South Africa: Champion
Johan Kriek
1981 Australian Open
Tunisia: Third Round (x2)
Malek Jaziri
2015 Australian Open, 2017 Australian Open
Zimbabwe: Quarterfinalist (x2)
Byron Black
1995 US Open, 2000 Wimbledon

Asia
Armenia: Fourth Round (x2)
Sargis Sargsian
2003 Australian Open, 2004 US Open
China: Second Round
Wu Yibing
2022 US Open
Chinese Taipei: Quarterfinalist
Lu Yen-hsun
2010 Wimbledon
Georgia: Finalist
Alex Metreveli
1973 Wimbledon
Hong Kong
India: Quarterfinalist (x4)
Vijay Amitraj
1973 Wimbledon, 1973 US Open, 1974 US Open, 1981 Wimbledon
Indonesia
Iran: Second Round
Mansour Bahrami
1981 French Open
Israel: Quarterfinalist
Amos Mansdorf
1992 Australian Open
Japan: Finalist
Kei Nishikori
2014 US Open
Kazakhstan: Fourth Round (x2)
Mikhail Kukushkin
2012 Australian Open, 2019 Wimbledon
Pakistan: Third Round
Haroon Rahim
1971 US Open
Philippines: Second Round (x5)
Cecil Mamiit
1999 Australian Open, 1999 US Open, 2001 Australian Open, 2001 French Open, 2002 French Open
South Korea: Semifinalist
Hyeon Chung
2018 Australian Open
Thailand: Fourth Round (x3)
Paradorn Srichaphan
2003 Wimbledon, 2003 US Open, 2004 Australian Open
Turkey: Second Round (x7)
Marsel Ilhan
2009 US Open, 2010 Australian Open, 2010 Wimbledon, 2011 French Open, 2011 US Open, 2015 Wimbledon, 2015 US Open
Uzbekistan: Fourth Round (x3)
Denis Istomin
2012 US Open, 2013 Wimbledon, 2017 Australian Open
Vietnam

Europe
Austria: Champion
Thomas Muster
1995 French Open
Dominic Thiem
2020 US Open
Belarus: Quarterfinalist
Max Mirnyi
2002 US Open
Belgium: Semifinalist
Xavier Malisse
2002 Wimbledon
Bosnia and Herzegovina: Third Round (x5)
Damir Džumhur
2014 Australian Open, 2015 French Open, 2017 US Open, 2018 Australian Open, 2018 French Open
Bulgaria: Semifinalist (x3)
Grigor Dimitrov
2014 Wimbledon, 2017 Australian Open, 2019 US Open
Croatia: Champion
Goran Ivanišević
2001 Wimbledon
Marin Čilić
2014 US Open
Cyprus: Finalist
Marcos Baghdatis
2006 Australian Open
Czech Republic: Champion (x8)
Ivan Lendl
1984 French Open, 1985 US Open, 1986 French Open, 1986 US Open, 1987 French Open, 1987 US Open, 1989 Australian Open, 1990 Australian Open
Denmark: Quarterfinalist
Holger Rune
2022 French Open
Estonia: Third Round
Jürgen Zopp
2018 French Open
Finland: Quarterfinalist (x3)
Jarkko Nieminen
2005 US Open, 2006 Wimbledon, 2008 Australian Open
France: Champion
Yannick Noah
1983 French Open
Germany: Champion (x6)
Boris Becker
1985 Wimbledon, 1986 Wimbledon, 1989 Wimbledon, 1989 US Open, 1991 Australian Open, 1996 Australian Open
Greece: Finalist (x2)
Stefanos Tsitsipas
2021 French Open, 2023 Australian Open
Hungary: Quarterfinalist (x2)
Balázs Taróczy
1976 French Open, 1981 French Open
Iceland
Ireland: Fourth Round
Matt Doyle
1982 US Open
Italy: Champion
Adriano Panatta
1976 French Open
Latvia: Semifinalist
Ernests Gulbis
2014 French Open
Lithuania: Third Round (x4)
Ričardas Berankis
2011 Australian Open, 2013 Australian Open, 2020 US Open, 2021 French Open
Luxembourg: Quarterfinalist (x2)
Gilles Müller
2008 US Open, 2017 Wimbledon
Macedonia
Moldova: Third Round (x4)
Radu Albot
2017 US Open, 2018 Wimbledon, 2021 Australian Open, 2022 Australian Open
Monaco: Third Round
Jean-René Lisnard
2005 Australian Open
Montenegro
Netherlands: Champion
Richard Krajicek
1996 Wimbledon
Norway: Finalist (x2)
Casper Ruud
2022 French Open, 2022 US Open
Poland: Semifinalist
Jerzy Janowicz
2013 Wimbledon
Hubert Hurkacz
2021 Wimbledon
Portugal: Fourth Round (x2)
João Sousa
2018 US Open, 2019 Wimbledon
Romania: Champion (x2)
Ilie Nastase
1972 US Open, 1973 French Open
Russia: Champion (x2)
Yevgeny Kafelnikov
1996 French Open, 1999 Australian Open
Marat Safin
2000 US Open, 2005 Australian Open
Serbia: Champion (x22)
Novak Djokovic
2008 Australian Open, 2011 Australian Open, 2011 Wimbledon, 2011 US Open, 2012 Australian Open, 2013 Australian Open, 2014 Wimbledon, 2015 Australian Open, 2015 Wimbledon, 2015 US Open, 2016 Australian Open, 2016 French Open, 2018 Wimbledon, 2018 US Open, 2019 Australian Open, 2019 Wimbledon, 2020 Australian Open, 2021 Australian Open, 2021 French Open, 2021 Wimbledon, 2022 Wimbledon, 2023 Australian Open
Slovakia: Finalist (x2)
Miloslav Mecir
1986 US Open, 1989 Australian Open
Slovenia: Third Round (x6)
Aljaž Bedene
2016 French Open, 2017 Wimbledon, 2019 US Open, 2020 French Open, 2021 Wimbledon, 2022 French Open
Spain: Champion (x22)
Rafael Nadal
2005 French Open, 2006 French Open, 2007 French Open, 2008 French Open, 2008 Wimbledon, 2009 Australian Open, 2010 French Open, 2010 Wimbledon, 2010 US Open, 2011 French Open, 2012 French Open, 2013 French Open, 2013 US Open, 2014 French Open, 2017 French Open, 2017 US Open, 2018 French Open, 2019 French Open, 2019 US Open, 2020 French Open, 2022 Australian Open, 2022 French Open
Sweden: Champion (x11)
Björn Borg
1974 French Open, 1975 French Open, 1976 Wimbledon, 1977 Wimbledon, 1978 French Open, 1978 Wimbledon, 1979 French Open, 1979 Wimbledon, 1980 French Open, 1980 Wimbledon, 1981 French Open
Switzerland: Champion (x20)
Roger Federer
2003 Wimbledon, 2004 Australian Open, 2004 Wimbledon, 2004 US Open, 2005 Wimbledon, 2005 US Open, 2006 Australian Open, 2006 Wimbledon, 2006 US Open, 2007 Australian Open, 2007 Wimbledon, 2007 US Open, 2008 US Open, 2009 French Open, 2009 Wimbledon, 2010 Australian Open, 2012 Wimbledon, 2017 Australian Open, 2017 Wimbledon, 2018 Australian Open
Ukraine: Finalist
Andriy Medvedev
1999 French Open
United Kingdom: Champion (x3)
Andy Murray
2012 US Open, 2013 Wimbledon, 2016 Wimbledon

Women

Oceania
Australia: Champion (x11)
Margaret Court
1969 Australian Open, 1969 French Open, 1969 US Open, 1970 Australian Open, 1970 French Open, 1970 Wimbledon, 1970 US Open, 1971 Australian Open, 1973 Australian Open, 1973 French Open, 1973 US Open
New Zealand: Semifinalist
Belinda Cordwell
1989 Australian Open

North America
Canada: Champion
Bianca Andreescu
2019 US Open
Mexico: Quarterfinalist (x2)
Angélica Gavaldón
1990 Australian Open, 1995 Australian Open
Puerto Rico: Fourth Round (x2)
Kristina Brandi
2000 Australian Open, 2000 Wimbledon
United States: Champion (x23)
Serena Williams
1999 US Open, 2002 French Open, 2002 Wimbledon, 2002 US Open, 2003 Australian Open, 2003 Wimbledon, 2005 Australian Open, 2007 Australian Open, 2008 US Open, 2009 Australian Open, 2009 Wimbledon, 2010 Australian Open, 2010 Wimbledon, 2012 Wimbledon, 2012 US Open, 2013 French Open, 2013 US Open, 2014 US Open, 2015 Australian Open, 2015 French Open, 2015 Wimbledon, 2016 Wimbledon, 2017 Australian Open

South America
Argentina: Champion
Gabriela Sabatini
1990 US Open
Brazil: Second Round (x7)
Beatriz Haddad Maia
2017 Wimbledon, 2018 Australian Open, 2019 Australian Open, 2019 Wimbledon, 2022 Australian Open, 2022 French Open, 2022 US Open
Colombia: Semifinalist
Fabiola Zuluaga
2004 Australian Open
Paraguay: Fourth Round
Rossana de los Ríos
2000 French Open
Peru: Quarterfinalist
Laura Arraya
1991 Wimbledon
Venezuela: Fourth Round (x2)
Maria Vento-Kabchi
1997 Wimbledon, 2005 US Open

Africa
Egypt: Second Round (x2)
Mayar Sherif
2021 Australian Open, 2022 French Open
Madagascar: Third Round (x3)
Dally Randriantefy
1995 Australian Open, 1996 US Open, 2003 French Open
Morocco: First Round (x2)
Bahia Mouhtassine
2002 Australian Open, 2003 French Open
South Africa: Semifinalist (x3)
Amanda Coetzer
1996 Australian Open, 1997 Australian Open, 1997 French Open 
Tunisia: Finalist (x2)
Ons Jabeur
2022 Wimbledon, 2022 US Open
Zimbabwe: Fourth Round
Cara Black
2001 French Open

Asia
China: Champion (x2)
Li Na
2011 French Open, 2014 Australian Open
Chinese Taipei: Quarterfinalist
Hsieh Su-Wei
2021 Australian Open
Georgia: Quarterfinalist
Leila Meskhi
1990 Wimbledon
India: Fourth Round
Sania Mirza
2005 US Open
Indonesia: Quarterfinalist
Yayuk Basuki
1997 Wimbledon
Iran: Fourth Round (x2)
Aravane Rezaï
2006 US Open, 2009 French Open
Israel: Quarterfinalist (x2)
Shahar Pe'er
2007 Australian Open, 2007 US Open
Japan: Champion (x4)
Naomi Osaka
2018 US Open, 2019 Australian Open, 2020 US Open, 2021 Australian Open
Kazakhstan: Champion
Elena Rybakina
2022 Wimbledon
South Korea: Third Round (x2)
Cho Yoon-Jeong
2002 US Open, 2005 US Open
Thailand: Quarterfinalist
Tamarine Tanasugarn
2008 Wimbledon
Turkey: Second Round (x3)
Cagla Buyukakcay
2016 French Open, 2016 US Open, 2017 French Open
Uzbekistan: Third Round (x3)
Iroda Tulyaganova
2001 Wimbledon, 2002 Australian Open, 2002 French Open

Europe
Albania
Andorra
Austria: Quarterfinalist (x2)
Tamira Paszek
2011 Wimbledon, 2012 Wimbledon
Belarus: Champion (x2)
Victoria Azarenka
2012 Australian Open, 2013 Australian Open
Belgium: Champion (x7)
Justine Henin
2003 French Open, 2003 US Open, 2004 Australian Open, 2005 French Open, 2006 French Open, 2007 French Open, 2007 US Open
Bosnia and Herzegovina: First Round (x3)
Mervana Jugić-Salkić
2004 French Open, 2004 Wimbledon, 2005 French Open
Bulgaria: Semifinalist (x2)
Manuela Maleeva
1992 US Open, 1993 US Open
Croatia: Champion
Iva Majoli
1997 French Open
Czech Republic: Champion (x4)
Hana Mandlikova
1980 Australian Open, 1981 French Open, 1985 US Open, 1987 Australian Open
Denmark: Champion
Caroline Wozniacki
2018 Australian Open
Estonia: Quarterfinalist (x7)
Kaia Kanepi
2008 French Open, 2010 Wimbledon, 2010 US Open, 2012 French Open, 2013 Wimbledon, 2017 US Open, 2022 Australian Open
Finland: Second Round (x4)
Emma Laine
2005 US Open, 2006 Australian Open, 2006 French Open, 2006 US Open
France: Champion (x2)
Mary Pierce
1995 Australian Open, 2000 French Open
Amelie Mauresmo
2006 Australian Open, 2006 Wimbledon
Germany: Champion (x22)
Steffi Graf
1987 French Open, 1988 Australian Open, 1988 French Open, 1988 Wimbledon, 1988 US Open, 1989 Australian Open, 1989 Wimbledon, 1989 US Open, 1990 Australian Open, 1991 Wimbledon, 1992 Wimbledon, 1993 French Open, 1993 Wimbledon, 1993 US Open, 1994 Australian Open, 1995 French Open, 1995 Wimbledon, 1995 US Open, 1996 French Open, 1996 Wimbledon, 1996 US Open, 1999 Wimbledon
Greece: Semifinalist (x2)
Maria Sakkari
2021 French Open, 2021 US Open
Hungary: Fourth Round (x2)
Andrea Temesvari
1983 French Open, 1984 Wimbledon 
Ireland
Italy: Champion
Francesca Schiavone
2010 French Open
Flavia Pennetta
2015 US Open
Latvia: Champion
Jeļena Ostapenko
2017 French Open
Liechtenstein
Lithuania
Luxembourg: Third Round (x3)
Anne Kremer
1999 Wimbledon, 2002 French Open, 2004 Wimbledon
Macedonia
Malta
Moldova
Montenegro: Third Round (x2)
Danka Kovinic
2022 Australian Open, 2022 French Open
Netherlands: Finalist
Betty Stöve
1977 Wimbledon
Norway: First Round
Amy Jonsson
1988 Australian Open
Poland: Champion (x3)
Iga Świątek
2020 French Open, 2022 French Open, 2022 US Open
Portugal: Third Round (x3)
Michelle Larcher de Brito
2009 French Open, 2013 Wimbledon, 2014 Wimbledon
Romania: Champion (x2)
Simona Halep
2018 French Open, 2019 Wimbledon
Russia: Champion (x5)
Maria Sharapova
2004 Wimbledon, 2006 US Open, 2008 Australian Open, 2012 French Open, 2015 French Open
Serbia: Champion
Ana Ivanovic
2008 French Open
Slovakia: Finalist
Dominika Cibulkova
2014 Australian Open
Slovenia: Semifinalist
Tamara Zidansek
2021 French Open
Spain: Champion (x4)
Arantxa Sanchez Vicario
1989 French Open, 1994 French Open, 1994 US Open, 1998 French Open
Sweden: Semifinalist (x2)
Catarina Lindqvist
1987 Australian Open, 1989 Wimbledon
Switzerland: Champion (x5)
Martina Hingis
1997 Australian Open, 1997 Wimbledon, 1997 US Open, 1998 Australian Open, 1999 Australian Open
Ukraine: Semifinalist (x2)
Elina Svitolina
2019 Wimbledon, 2019 US Open
United Kingdom: Champion (x3)
Virginia Wade
1968 US Open, 1972 Australian Open, 1977 Wimbledon

Top ranked by country – doubles

Men

Women

Footnotes

References

Lists of tennis players
highest